Lucius Aurelius Orestes was a Roman politician who served as consul of the Roman republic in 126 BC with Marcus Aemilius Lepidus. He had served as praetor some time before 129 BC. After his consulship, he was assigned as proconsul in Sardinia, with Marcus Aemilius Scaurus and Gaius Gracchus as his subordinates. 

His command in Sardinia was prorogued in 124 BC, which his quaestor and lieutenant Gaius Gracchus responded to by deserting for home to stand for plebeian tribune. After winning victory over the natives, he triumphed in 122 BC.

See also 
 Gaius Gracchus, who was assigned as one of his quaestors in Sardinia

References 

Sources
 
 
 

2nd-century BC Roman consuls
Orestes, Lucius